Uhub (u2-hub2), (c. 2600 BCE), was Ensi (Governor) of the Sumerian city-state of Kish before Mesilim

His name is missing from the Sumerian king list, just as the name of Mesilim, who ruled about fifty years later. On a vase dedicated to god Zababa, Uhub described himself as victor of Hamazi, a location beyond the Tigris, between the Diyala and lower Zab regions.

Uhub is otherwise known from a few more inscriptions.

See also

History of Sumer

References

Bibliography 
 Vojtech Zamarovský, Na počiatku bol Sumer, Mladé letá, 1968 Bratislava
 Plamen Rusev,  Mesalim, Lugal Na Kish: Politicheska Istoriia Na Ranen Shumer (XXVIII-XXVI V. Pr. N. E.),  Faber, 2001 (LanguageBulgarian)   [(Mesalim, Lugal of Kish. Political History of Early Sumer (XXVIII–XXVI century BC.)]

Sumerian kings
25th-century BC rulers